The women's singles Squash event was part of the squash programme and took place between September 20 and 23, at the Yeorumul Squash Courts.

Schedule
All times are Korea Standard Time (UTC+09:00)

Results

Final

Top half

Bottom half

References 

Squash Site page
Draw and Results

Squash at the 2014 Asian Games